DiSanto (or Di Santo) is a surname. Notable people with the surname include:

 Celina Di Santo((born 2000), Argentinian field hockey player
 Francesco Disanto (born 1994), Italian footballer
 Franco Di Santo (born 1989), Argentine footballer
 Grace DiSanto (1924-1993), American poet
 John DiSanto, American politician
 Lautaro Disanto (born 1998), Argentine professional footballer
 Lynne DiSanto, American politician
 Michael di Santo (born 1989), American rower
 Tony DiSanto, American businessman

Places:
 DiSanto Field, football stadium in Cleveland, Ohio